was a Japanese Heavy psych power trio supergroup formed in 1970 by guitarist Shinki Chen, and record producer Ikuzo Orita.

Orita had previously produced an LP featuring Shinki Chen; who was considered the Japanese equivalent of Jimi Hendrix. The self-titled album Shinki Chen featured other notable musicians, including George Yanagi and Masayoshi Kabe. To many in Japan, it is now considered a classic, and is a part of Universal Music's "Naked Line" series of legitimate digitally remastered reissues. After the release of Shinki Chen's debut solo LP, Orita took over the Japanese division of Atlantic Records and brought Shinki over to the label. Orita formed the trio Speed, Glue & Shinki with former Golden Cups bassist Masayoshi Kabe, and Filipino singer-drummer Joey Smith, whom Shinki had discovered performing with his band "Zero History" at a shopping centre in Yokohama. The band took their name from Smith's use of amphetamines, and Kabe's interest of sniffing Pro-Bond glue during the 1960s. 

Speed, Glue & Shinki released their debut album Eve in 1971, but immediately split up due to mixed reviews, low sales and with Shinki and Kabe not being able to tolerate Smith's personal life. After they disbanded, a large double-LP was independently released by Smith, titled Speed, Glue & Shinki, which was mostly the work of Joey Smith and new bassist / co-lead vocalist Mike Hanopol (ex "Zero History") for the departed Masayoshi Kabe; sampling guitar recordings of Shinki from previous studio work. However, it also featured two unreleased songs titled "Sniffin & Snortin" and "Run & Hide" which were recorded for Eve but excluded from the final release, as they did not fit the album's overall sound. Thereafter, Shinki took a disliking to recording music, and decided to become a live musician only; which he continues doing to the present day. Kabe continued his own successful music career most prominently with the supergroup "Pink Cloud", while Smith reinvented his stage persona as "Pepe Smith" and he and Mike Hanopol returned to the Philippines reuniting with their "Zero History" ex bandmate & guitarist Wally Gonzalez, where they three became something of a phenomenon with their Pinoy rock power trio supergroup, Juan de la Cruz Band. Joey "Pepe" Smith died in January, 2019 aged 71. Masayoshi "Glue" Kabe died in September, 2020 aged 70.

On 25 December 2019, both the group's albums were officially reissued on vinyl by Atlantic, the first official album vinyl reissues of the albums in 48 years in Japan.

On 06 October 2021, Super Fuji Discs released a Speed, Glue & Shinki live album dating from 1971 entitled "Maahngamyauh".

On 23 April 2022, Atlantic / Run Out Groove is releasing Speed, Glue & Shinki debut album, "Eve", the first ever official album vinyl release of the album in 51 years in the United States. 2022 U.S. reissue for Record Store Day on multi-colored vinyl with obi strip. Limited to 3,500 copies.

References

1970 establishments in Japan
1972 disestablishments in Japan
Japanese psychedelic rock music groups
Musical groups established in 1970
Musical groups disestablished in 1972